Eduardo Arménio do Nascimento Cabrita (born 26 September 1961, in Barreiro) is a Portuguese legal professional and politician who served as Minister Assistant in the cabinet of Prime Minister António Costa from 2015 until 2021. He was a member of parliament from 2002 to 2015, before taking office as minister in the Government.

During his time in government, Cabrita faced criticism over a range of incidents, including the death of a Ukrainian immigrant in custody at Lisbon airport; authorization for celebrations of the national football championship that were blamed for spreading COVID-19; and his handling of a coronavirus outbreak among migrant farm hands. On 3 December 2021, he resigned after his driver was accused of “negligent homicide” over the death of a highway worker, while driving Cabrita's car at 40 km/h above the speed limit, being substituted on the day after by the Minister of Justice Francisca Van Dunem.

Personal life
Cabrita is graduated in law from the University of Lisbon School of Law. He is married to Ana Paula Vitorino, also a member of António Costa's cabinet as Minister of Maritime Affairs.

References

1961 births
People from Barreiro, Portugal
Government ministers of Portugal
Living people
Socialist Party (Portugal) politicians
University of Lisbon alumni